Maurice Gastiger (3 October 1896 — 22 January 1966) was a French footballer who played as a forward for FÉC Levallois, Rennes and France.

Club career
Gastiger began his career with FÉC Levallois in 1913, playing with the club for seven seasons. In the 1920–21 season, Gastiger signed for Rennes. During his time at the club, Gastiger helped Rennes reach the 1922 Coupe de France Final.

International career
On 8 February 1914, Gastiger made his debut for France at the 17 years, 4 months and 5 days against Luxembourg, becoming France's youngest player in the process, a record that stood until 27 August 2020, when Eduardo Camavinga made his debut against Switzerland. On 8 March 1914, Gastiger scored his only goal for France, in a 2–2 draw against Switzerland.

International goals
Scores and results list France's goal tally first.

References

1896 births
1966 deaths
Sportspeople from Haut-Rhin
French footballers
Association football forwards
France international footballers
Stade Rennais F.C. players
Olympic footballers of France
Footballers at the 1920 Summer Olympics
Footballers from Alsace